Barry Curtis may refer to:

 Barry Curtis (actor) (1943–2019), American film and television actor
 Barry Curtis (mayor) (born 1939), served as mayor (1983–2007) of Manukau City, New Zealand
Barry Curtis Park, a park in south Auckland, New Zealand
 Barry Curtis (bishop) (born 1933), retired Anglican bishop in Canada